CC-preferring endodeoxyribonuclease (Streptomyces glaucescens exocytoplasmic dodeoxyribonuclease) is an enzyme. This enzyme catalyses the following chemical reaction

 endonucleolytic cleavage to give 5'-phosphooligonucleotide end-products, with a preference for cleavage within the sequence CC

This enzyme has preference for CC sites in double-stranded circular and linear DNA.

References

External links 

EC 3.1.21